Robert W. Lawson Jr. (born October 12, 1942) is an American politician. He served as a Democratic member for the 9-2 district of the Georgia House of Representatives.

Born in Hall County, Georgia. Lawson attended the University of Georgia, where he earned his Bachelor of Arts degree in 1964 and Juris Doctor degree in 1967. After graduating, he served in the United States Air Force until 1969. Lawson had served as the assistant district attorney for the Northeast Circuit. In 1979, he won election in the 9-2 district of the Georgia House of Representatives, succeeding Doug Whitmore. He served until the 1990s.

References 

1942 births
Living people
People from Hall County, Georgia
Democratic Party members of the Georgia House of Representatives
20th-century American politicians
University of Georgia alumni